New Biotechnology is a peer-reviewed scientific journal and the official journal of the European Federation of Biotechnology. It is published bimonthly by Elsevier. The journal covers research, industrial, and commercial aspects of biotechnology, in areas such as: healthcare and pharmaceuticals; food and agriculture; biofuels; genetic engineering and molecular biology; genomics and synthetic biology; nanotechnology; environment and biodiversity; biocatalysis; bioremediation; and process engineering.

History 
The journal was established in 1984 as Gene Analysis Techniques. It changed names in 1991 (Genetic Analysis: Biomolecular Engineering) and 1999 (Biomolecular Engineering), before obtaining its current title in 2007.

Abstracting and indexing 
The journal is abstracted and indexed in:

External links 
 
 Gene Analysis Techniques
 Genetic Analysis: Biomolecular Engineering
 Biomolecular Engineering

Biotechnology journals
Bimonthly journals
Elsevier academic journals
Publications established in 1984
English-language journals